Arab Wheelchair Basketball Championship  Open Arab Championships

Results

Men

References 

Wheelchair basketball competitions between national teams